Marta Cattani (born 19 January 1973 in Vicenza, Italy) is a retired Italian basketball player.

References

External links
 

1973 births
Living people
Italian women's basketball players
Sportspeople from Vicenza
20th-century Italian women